White Widow may refer to:

 Samantha Lewthwaite (born 1983), terrorist suspect and widow of 7/7 suicide bomber Germaine Lindsay
 Sally-Anne Jones, British-born U.N.-designated recruiter and propaganda for the Islamic State (ISIS)
 White Widow (Cannabis), a strain of Cannabis
 White widow spider (Latrodectus pallidus), a white-colored species of widow spiders
 White Widow, a novel by Jim Lehrer
 White Widow, a fictional character in Mission: Impossible – Fallout
"White Widow", a song by the Italian band Afterhours

See also
 Widow White Creek, California